Villa Rosa is a frazione (subdivision) of the town of Martinsicuro, in the Province of Teramo in the Abruzzo region of Italy.

History 
The town began to develop in the second half of the nineteenth century with the name of Villa Franchi (they were a family of local landowners). In the early twentieth century it took the name of Villa Rosa. For a long time it was part of the Municipality of Colonnella, and subsequently detaching itself from it together with Martinsicuro in 1963.

Architecture 
In the hamlet of Villa Rosa there are a few notable buildings, including Villa Franchi (late 19th century) in Via Roma-Via Petrolini; Villa Franchi (1902) in Via Filzi; Castellaccio Franchi (1850–1860) in C.da Civita; Villa Flaiani (1813–1860) in Via Col di Lana; the so-called " Casette Flaiani " (early 1900s) in Via Risorgimento.

References 

Frazioni of the Province of Teramo